Waino Edward Hendrickson (June 18, 1896June 22, 1983) was an American Republican politician & businessman, the final Governor of the Territory of Alaska, before statehood.

Hendrickson was born in Juneau in 1896. He served in World War I before he became a manager at the Juneau city dock. He worked in business before he entered politics in 1946 and was elected Mayor of Juneau. He served as mayor until 1953. He was also a member of the Territorial House from 1948 to 1953.

He was Secretary of Alaska Territory from 1953 to 1959 in which capacity he served as acting governor twice because of the resignations of Governors Frank Heintzleman and Mike Stepovich.

Early life
Hendrickson was born June 18, 1896, in Juneau, Alaska, where he grew up the son of Finnish immigrants. After graduating from Juneau High School in 1916, he worked in the mine. After an accident, Hendrickson lost partial sight in one eye. After this, he served in the U.S. military during World War I, and was en route to France before the armistice was signed. After being discharged from the army, he worked as a manager at the Juneau city dock.

Political career

Hendrickson entered politics in 1946, when, upon the urging of his friends, he was elected mayor of Juneau. In this role, he helped the city gain the power to levy and use sales tax, which had not been enforced before, leading to a lack of funding for Juneau. Because of the collection of this tax, Hendrickson developed Juneau, leading the city to become the first city in Alaska to be fully paved. He served as Mayor of Juneau until 1953. While serving in this role, he was also a member of the territorial House of Representatives from 1948 to 1953.

In 1953, Hendrickson was appointed Secretary of Alaska Territory (equivalent to Lieutenant Governor of Alaska today) by President Dwight D. Eisenhower, under Governor Frank Heintzleman. He held this office until statehood, serving as acting governor twice, once in 1957, and again from 1958 to 1959. Hendrickson was the first Alaska governor born in the territory. After statehood Hendrickson served on several government commissions, as well as chairing the Interior Department's Alaska Field Committee, and the Juneau office of the Bureau of Land Management. He retired due to poor eyesight, in 1965.

Later life

Hendrickson would stay up at night to care for his wife, who was ill with cancer. She died in 1962.

After his retirement, Hendrickson went to live with his daughter in Anchorage, Alaska, and spent the rest of his life with her until he died in 1983, at the age of 87.

References

External links
 University of Alaska, Stories – Waino Hendrickson, A Man of the People
 Waino Hendrickson at 100 Years of Alaska's Legislature

1896 births
1983 deaths
Alaska Republicans
American military personnel of World War I
American people of Finnish descent
Businesspeople from Alaska
Governors of Alaska Territory
Mayors of Juneau, Alaska
Members of the Alaska Territorial Legislature
20th-century American politicians
Burials at Evergreen Cemetery (Juneau, Alaska)
20th-century American businesspeople
20th-century American Episcopalians